Damaris Beatriz Quélez Jiménez (born 14 August 1990) is a Salvadoran footballer who plays as a forward for CD FAS and El Salvador women's national team.

International goals
Scores and results list El Salvador's goal tally first.

See also
List of El Salvador women's international footballers

References

1990 births
Living people
Salvadoran women's footballers
Women's association football forwards
El Salvador women's international footballers
Salvadoran expatriate footballers
Salvadoran expatriate sportspeople in Guatemala
Expatriate footballers in Guatemala